Gaja in Sanskrit means elephant. 'Brishta' is the back or hip portion of a sitting elephant. The later Cholas of the Chola empire in the Indian subcontinent, especially the ones in Thondai Mandalam around the North Tamil Nadu area constructed temples which had vimanas in this style.

The sanctum sanctorum of these temples, especially Shiva temples, had this style of vimana.

See also 
 Shiva Temples of Tamil Nadu

References 

Chopra, P.N; Ravindran, T.K; Subrahmanian, N (2003) [2003]. "History of South India ; Ancient, Medieval and Modern." New Delhi: S. Chand & Company Ltd. .
Anna Dallapiccola. "Dictionary of Hindu Lore and Legend" .

Hindu temple architecture